Comitas vezzaroi is a species of sea snail, a marine gastropod mollusc in the family Pseudomelatomidae, the turrids and allies.

Description
The length of the shell attains 56.4 mm.

Distribution
This marine species occurs off Darwin, Australia.

References

 Cossignani T. (2016). Comitas vezzaroi nuova specie dell'Australia. Malacologia Mostra Mondiale. 90: 29

External links
 Worldwide Mollusc Species Data Base: Comitas vezzaroi

vezzaroi
Gastropods described in 2016
Gastropods of Australia